Kärt Kross (née Kärt Hansberg; born on 1 January 1968 in Tallinn) is an Estonian actress.

From 1986 until 1996, she worked at Estonian Drama Theatre. Besides theatrical roles she has also appeared in several films.

Filmography

 1985 Puud olid ... (feature film; role: Ell)
 1986 Saja aasta pärast mais (feature film; role: Juliana Telman)
 1987 Tants aurukatla ümber (television film; role: Vilma)
 1991 Ankur (feature film; role: Iris)
 1992 Lammas all paremas nurgas (feature film; role: Daughter 1)
 1994 Ameerika mäed (feature film; role: Sirje)
 2006-2013 Kelgukoerad (television series; role: Airi / Archive administrator)
 2007 Brigaad 3 (television series; role: Margit)
 2015 Pilvede all (television series: role: Doctor)
 2017 Merivälja (television series; role: Ülle)
 2018 Elu hammasratastel (feature film)
 2018 Õigus õnnele (feature film: role: Principal Tiina)

References

Living people
1968 births
Estonian film actresses
Estonian stage actresses
Estonian television actresses
20th-century Estonian actresses
21st-century Estonian actresses
Actresses from Tallinn